Paone is a surname. Notable people with the surname include:

Alene Paone, American publisher
Antonino Paone (born 1955), Italian-American actor
Martin P. Paone (born 1951), U.S. Senate employee
Nando Paone (born 1956), Italian actor
Nicola Paone (1915–2003), Italian-American singer, songwriter and restaurateur
 Remigio Paone (1899–1977), Italian theatre producer